Taavetti (Taave) Ananias Junnila (27 March 1869 - 29 January 1943; surname until 1890 Yli-Maakala) was a Finnish farmer, bank director and politician, born in Mouhijärvi. He was a member of the Parliament of Finland, representing the Finnish Party from 1908 to 1913 and the National Coalition Party from 1922 to 1936.

References

1869 births
1943 deaths
People from Sastamala
People from Turku and Pori Province (Grand Duchy of Finland)
Finnish Party politicians
National Coalition Party politicians
Members of the Parliament of Finland (1908–09)
Members of the Parliament of Finland (1909–10)
Members of the Parliament of Finland (1910–11)
Members of the Parliament of Finland (1911–13)
Members of the Parliament of Finland (1922–24)
Members of the Parliament of Finland (1924–27)
Members of the Parliament of Finland (1927–29)
Members of the Parliament of Finland (1929–30)
Members of the Parliament of Finland (1930–33)
Members of the Parliament of Finland (1933–36)